Theisoa was a town of ancient Arcadia, in the district Cynuria or Parrhasia, on the northern slope of Mount Lycaeus, called after the nymph Theisoa, one of the nurses of Zeus. Its inhabitants were removed to Megalopolis upon the foundation of the latter city (371 BCE).

Its site is located near the modern Theisoa.

References

Populated places in ancient Arcadia
Former populated places in Greece
Parrhasia